Gordon's School is a secondary school with academy status in West End near Woking, Surrey, England. It was founded as the Gordon Boys' Home in 1885. It is now one of the 36 state boarding schools in England. It converted to an academy on 1 January 2013. It was ranked as the second-highest-achieving state boarding school in 2016 by The Daily Telegraph, but controversy arose over the school charging £8,209 a year for day-pupil places. It has been argued that makes the state school selective, along with others which charge similar fees. Under the Education Act 1996 it is illegal for state schools to charge for admission or education provided within normal hours. In June 2022 Gordon's was judged Boarding School of the Year by the TES (Times Educational Supplement).

History
The school was founded by public subscription in 1885 as the Gordon Boys' Home, as the National Memorial to General Gordon of Khartoum, an officer of the Corps of Royal Engineers, who had been killed in 1885. According to the school, the idea came from Queen Victoria, who was its first patron. However, in the 1914 due to the first World War, the school was closed for the entirety. It was then reopened soon after, in early 1919.The reigning monarch of the United Kingdom has been a patron ever since. Its first commandant was Major General Henry Tyndall, CB, ex 2nd Punjab Infantry, and its first home was Fort Wallingford.

Gordon's began as a home for underprivileged boys, but it quickly became a boys' boarding school. In 1888, the Gordon Foundation was established as an independent charitable trust to administer the school. In 1990, the first girls were admitted. It converted from being a voluntary aided school to an academy 1 January 2013.

Student body 
Gordon's is now a co-educational Academy school, and the pupils are a mixture of full and weekly boarders (judged outstanding in all categories of boarding by Ofsted in 2014 ) and day students. The proportion of pupils with special educational needsand/or disabilities is in line with national figures, but a higher proportion of pupils than is typical nationally have an education, health and care plan. The percentage of pupils who are supported by the pupil premium is well below the national average. The proportions of pupils who are from minority ethnic groups or speak English as an additional language are in line with national averages. Some two thirds of the pupils are day students. The school was subject to a Section 8 inspection in 2017 where it and its safeguarding procedures were judged to be outstanding.

Students are divided into ten houses named after places of particular relevance to General Gordon:

For girls - Augusta (full/weekly/day), China (day), Kensington (day), Victoria (day), Windsor (full/weekly/day)
For boys - Balmoral (full/weekly), Buckingham (day), Gravesend (day), Khartoum (day), Sandringham (full/weekly)

In September 2019 Woolwich House was opened, for Year 7 Residential Boarders.

Facilities 

Buildings
The central building on the south side of the Parade Ground is the  Assembly Hall and Reception building  that  was completed in 1887, designed by William Butterfield, in a Gothic revival style.
To the south of the original 1885 buildings in a Grade II listed building: the 1894 memorial school chapel built in memory of Prince Albert Victor, eldest son of Edward Prince of Wales who had helped fundraise for the boys home. It has a 4 bay criciform pan ans was designed by William Butterfield in Early English Gothic style.

In September 2007 a new science block was built. The block contains four science labs, two other classrooms with IT Systems. Also a new drama and music block was opened; the drama department consists of two studios. During the next year, it is hoped to build a black box performing arts area next to the department. In 2016, the Mcquillen Sixth Form house was converted into Victoria House and in 2018 the Nile Building, a six classroom mathematics teaching block was opened. A sports hall together with another all-weather pitch were opened in October 2020.

Gordon's opened a new sports hall in 2020, providing a sports hub for the school, which also includes a gym, a purpose built fitness centre, equipped with two Olympic weight lifting bars, a 25-metre shooting range, ergo centre  and facilities for tennis, netball and orienteering.

Curriculum
Virtually all maintained schools and academies follow the National Curriculum, and are inspected by Ofsted on how well they succeed in delivering a 'broad and balanced curriculum'. Schools endeavour to get all students to achieve the English Baccalaureate (EBACC) qualification - this must include core subjects a modern or ancient foreign language, and either History or Geography.

Ofsted in 2014 said that "the academic standards attained by students are very high. The proportion of students achieving five GCSE grades at A* to C, including English and mathematics is well above average. The quality of teaching is consistently good and often outstanding. Students are very enthusiastic about their learning because of this. Regular homework is used very effectively to promote their progress."

Extra curricular 
 Pipes and drums: Gordon's School marching band has about 30 bagpipers, 10 snare drummers, 10 tenor drummers and two bass drummers. The school marching band leads students along Whitehall London every year to the statue of General Gordon as part of the school's Memorial Weekend. As well as taking part in the Scottish Schools Pipe Band Championships, members of the Pipes and Drums have played at the Menin Gate in the Last Post Ceremony and for Her Majesty the Queen and His Royal Highness the Earl of Wessex. In 2017, the Pipes and Drums bandmaster, Cecil McCready was sentenced to 12 months in prison for three counts of sexual assault with a child by a person in a position of trust. McCready, a retired Irish Guard, had worked at the school for 17 years before his arrest and notably led the band to perform for Her Majesty the Queen at Commonwealth Day in 2014.
Combined Cadet Forces: Students are encouraged to participate in the Combined Cadet Forces in Year 10, this training is compulsory and students choose a section  (Army,Navy,Air) for the duration of the year. These training activities take place after normal lesson times, (termed as 'period seven' ).

Notable Gordonians 

Ellie Boatman (attended Gordon's School 2013-2015), England Rugby Union player. 
Jake Ball (rugby player) (attended Gordon's School 2002–2007), second row International Rugby Union player representing Wales in the RBS Six Nations and Scarlets in Llanelli, Wales. 
Daniel Gonzalez (spree killer) (attended Gordon’s School 1991-1996), a former boarding pupil who murdered four victims and attempted to murder two others in September 2004; sentenced to life imprisonment in 2006, he cited horror films he had seen at a young age as inspiration for his crimes. 
 
Paul Hull (attended Gordon's School 1980–1985), former English rugby union international full back and former head coach of Bristol Rugby.
Hannah Russell OBE (attended Gordon's School 2007–2012), British Paralympic Swimming silver medalist in the 2012 Summer Paralympic Games and World Champion at the 2013 IPC Swimming Championships in Montreal, Quebec, Canada. Double Gold medallist and world-record breaker in the Rio de Janeiro Paralympics 2016. Gold medallist in the Tokyo 2020 Paralympic Games.
Eboni Beckford-Chambers (attended Gordon's School from 2001–2004) England and Bath Netball Player, won a gold medal for England at the 2018 Gold Coast Commonwealth Games.
Steven Brown (attended Gordon's School 1998–2005) professional golfer who plays on the European Tour. In 2019 he won the Portugal Masters.

CBE 
Ex-headmaster Denis Mulkerrin was made a Commander of the Order of the British Empire (CBE) for Services to Education, in the 2005 New Year's Honours List.

References and notes

External links 
 
 Gordon's School archives, 1885-2004
 Gordon's School Boarders Handbook 2020

Boys' schools in Surrey
Secondary schools in Surrey
Educational institutions established in 1885
1885 establishments in England
Academies in Surrey
Boarding schools in Surrey